Walter Moers (born 24 May 1957 in Mönchengladbach) is a German comic creator and author.

Life and work

Moers held odd jobs after leaving school before starting a commercial apprenticeship. He taught himself how to draw, and has been publishing since 1984. He first became known for cartoon-like comics that were marked by an ironic view of the world and a conscious violation of political correctness. Many of his works first appeared in the satirical magazine Titanic. Although he doesn't contribute to the magazine anymore, he's still listed as contributor. His last work published in 'Titanic' was the Superhero-Parody 'Deadman' (not to be confused with the DC-Comics Superhero of the same name, Moers' character was just a dead man lying in a coffin for three pages without a word or any change in the pictures).

He rarely allows being photographed or interviewed, and every aspect of his biography (including name and date of birth) should be treated with caution.

His best-known comic characters are:
 Das kleine Arschloch (The little asshole), a precocious and irreverent little boy who constantly gets one over on the adults.
 Der alte Sack (The old curmudgeon), a terminally ill old man in a wheel chair who makes sarcastic comments on what he sees.
 Adolf, die Nazisau (Adolf, the Nazi swine), an absurd interpretation of Adolf Hitler in today's world.
 Käpt'n Blaubär (Capt'n Bluebear), a sea-faring bear with blue fur, who spins ridiculous pirate yarns, all of which, he claims, are true.

In addition to these comics clearly intended for an adult audience, Moers also writes stories and books that he has been publishing since 1985. In 1988, his first "Käpt'n Blaubär" story was published, a character that has since been popular on TV, in books, and in audio cassettes. Starting in 1999 with The 13½ Lives of Captain Bluebear, Moers has more recently become known for his novels, especially the Zamonia series.

Moers wrote both the script and the song lyrics for the movie  (1997) and the script for the movie Käpt'n Blaubär - Der Film (1999).

Zamonia series 
The first novel of the Zamonia series,  Die 13½ Leben des Käpt’n Blaubär, was originally published in 1999. The Captain Bluebear appearing in this novel is very distinct from the one portrayed in a popular German children's series Sendung mit der Maus. There, Captain Bluebear appears as a grandfather, whereas he is still a youngster in the novel. The book is written for adolescents and adults rather than for children. It introduces the reader to the fictional world of Zamonia by providing, among other things, a detailed map and descriptions of its various inhabitants.

The second Zamonia novel is Ensel und Krete which has not been published in English. The title intentionally misspells Hansel and Gretel, and the plot bears only thin parallels to it.

After Ensel und Krete, the Zamonia series continued with Rumo & His Miraculous Adventures, The City of Dreaming Books, The Alchemaster's Apprentice,  Prinzessin Insomnia & der alptraumfarbene Nachtmahr (literally, Princess Insomnia and the nightmare-coloured Nightmare), and The Labyrinth of Dreaming Books. All of these novels, except Captain Bluebear and Rumo, include prefaces that explains to the reader that the fictional character Hildegunst von Mythenmetz is the actual author and that Walter Moers only translated the books from the Zamonian language to German.

In the Zamonia series, each book contains detailed illustrations drawn by Moers; many portray creatures that Moers invented himself. Apart from these drawings, neologisms, anagrams and intertextuality play a key role in the style of Moers' novels.

Works available in English translation
Little Asshole, 1991, Eichborn, 
The 13½ Lives of Captain Bluebear, 2000 (UK) / 2005 (US)
A Wild Ride Through the Night, 2004
Rumo & His Miraculous Adventures : a novel in two books, 2004
The City of Dreaming Books, 2006. 
The Alchemaster's Apprentice, 2009 (English Edn).  978-1-846-55222-9
The Labyrinth of Dreaming Books, 2012 (English Edn)

Works

 Die Klerikalen, 1985 (comic)
 Aha!, 1985 (comic)
 Hey!, 1986 (comic)
 Das Tier (the animal), 1987 (story with pictures)
 Schweinewelt (pigs' world), 1987 (comic)
 Die Schimauski-Methode (the Schimauski method), 1987 (children's book)
 Herzlichen Glückwunsch (congratulations), 1985 (comic)
 Von ganzem Herzen (whole-heartedly), 1989 (comic)
 Kleines Arschloch (little asshole), 1990 (comic)
 Schöne Geschichten (beautiful stories), 1991 (comic)
 Das kleine Arschloch kehrt zurück (the little asshole returns), 1991 (comic)
 Schöner leben mit dem kleinen Arschloch (better living with the little asshole), 1992 (illustrated satires)
 Es ist ein Arschloch, Maria (it's an asshole, Mary), 1992 (comic)
 Der alte Sack, ein kleines Arschloch und andere Höhepunkte des Kapitalismus (the old curmudgeon, a little asshole and other pinnacles of capitalism), 1993 (comic)
 Arschloch in Öl (asshole in oil), 1993 (graphical parodies)
 Du bist ein Arschloch, mein Sohn (you're an asshole, son), 1995 (comic)
 Sex und Gewalt (sex and violence), 1995 (comic)
 Wenn der Pinguin zweimal klopft (the penguin always knocks twice), 1997 (comic)
  (little asshole), 1997 (movie: script and song lyrics)
 Adolf, 1998 (comic)
 Feuchte Träume (wet dreams), 1999 (comic)
 Adolf, Teil 2 (Adolf, part 2), 1999 (comic)
 Die 13½ Leben des Käpt'n Blaubär (The 13½ Lives of Captain Bluebear), 1999 (novel)
 Käpt'n Blaubär – Der Film (captain Bluebear – the movie), 1999 (movie: script; for children)
 Ensel und Krete (the plot of which is loosely based on "Hansel and Gretel"), 2000 (novel)
 Schwulxx-Comix (gay'xx comix), 2000 (comic, with Ralf König)
 Wilde Reise durch die Nacht (A Wild Ride Through the Night), 2001 (novel)
 Schamlos! (unashamedly!), 2001 (comics with additional material)
 Der Fönig (the Fing), 2002 (story with pictures about a King who always mixes up the letters "F" and "K")
 Rumo & Die Wunder im Dunkeln (Rumo : And His Miraculous Adventures), 2003 (novel)
 Die Stadt der Träumenden Bücher (The City of Dreaming Books), 2004 (novel)
 Adolf. Der Bonker (Adolf. The Bunker), 2005 (comic, the truth about Adolf Hitler's last days in the bunker)
  (The little asshole and the old curmudgeon – To die is shit), 2006 (movie: script)
 Der Schrecksenmeister, (The Alchemaster's Apprentice) 2007 (novel)
 Das Labyrinth der Träumenden Bücher, (The Labyrinth of Dreaming Books), 2011 (novel)
 Die Insel der Tausend Leuchttürme, (The Island of a Thousand Lighthouses), not yet published (novel)

Further reading

References

External links

 

1957 births
Living people
German comics artists
German speculative fiction artists
German children's writers
German fantasy writers
Writers who illustrated their own writing
German male writers